Cymburgis of Masovia,, also Zimburgis or Cimburga (1394 or 1397 –  28 September 1429), a member of the Polish Piast dynasty, was Duchess of Austria from 1412 until 1424, by her marriage with the Habsburg duke Ernest the Iron. As the mother of later Emperor Frederick III, Cymburgis, after Gertrude of Hohenberg, became the second female ancestor of all later Habsburgs, as only her husband's Ernestine branch of the family survived in the male line.

Life
She was the second daughter of Duke Siemowit IV, a scion of the Masovian branch of the Piasts, and his consort Alexandra, a daughter of Grand Duke Algirdas of Lithuania from the dynasty of Gediminids and sister of King Władysław II Jagiełło of Poland.

Though his elder brother William's engagement with the Polish princess Jadwiga had mortifyingly failed, Duke Ernest the Iron, after the death of his first wife Margaret of Pomerania, proceeded to Kraków in disguise to court Cymburgis. According to legend, he stepped into her heart when he participated in a royal hunt and saved the princess from an attacking bear. Actually, her uncle King Władysław II, stuck in the Polish–Lithuanian–Teutonic War and struggling with the Luxembourg king Sigismund of Hungary took the occasion to strengthen ties with the Habsburg dynasty and gave his consent.

The wedding took place on 25 January 1412 in Buda, the residence of King Sigismund, where he mediated the peace negotiations between Poland and the Teutonic Order. Though not approved by the Habsburg family, the marriage turned out to be a happy one. Upon the death of his brothers William and Leopold IV, Ernest became the sole ruler of the Inner Austrian territories, while his cousin Albert V ruled over the Duchy of Austria proper.

Although controversial, it has been claimed (since at least by Robert Burton in 1621) that she brought the distinctive protruding lower lip (prognathism) into the family, a particular physical characteristic of most members of the family for many generations until the 18th century. It can even be recognized in some of her distant descendants (though not as markedly) as King Alfonso XIII of Spain (1886–1941). However, already her husband's great-grandfather King Albert I or his uncle Duke Rudolf IV were presented in portraits with it, while Cymburgis' statue in the Innsbruck Hofkirche church does not show this feature. 

Tradition has it that she was also known for her exceptional strength, which, for example, she showed by driving nails into the wall with her bare hands and cracking nuts between her fingers. Cymburgis outlived her husband and died on a pilgrimage to Mariazell while staying at Türnitz (in present-day Lower Austria). She is buried at Lilienfeld Abbey.

Issue

During their marriage, Cymburgis and Ernest had nine children, of whom only four survived infancy:
 Frederick III, Holy Roman Emperor (b. Innsbruck, 21 September 1415 – d. Linz, 19 August 1493).
 Margaret of Austria (b. Wiener Neustadt, 1416 – d. Altenburg, 12 February 1486), married Frederick II, Elector of Saxony.
 Albert VI, Archduke of Austria (b. Vienna, 18 December 1418 – d. Vienna, 2 December 1463).
 Catherine of Austria (b. Wiener Neustadt, 1420 – Schloss Hohenbaden, 11 September 1493), married Charles I, Margrave of Baden-Baden.
 Ernest II of Austria (b. Wiener Neustadt, 1420 - d. Wiener Neustadt, 10 August 1432).
 Alexandra of Austria (b. and d. Wiener Neustadt, 1421).
 Anna of Austria (b. Wiener Neustadt, 1422 – d. Wiener Neustadt, 11 November 1429).
 Leopold of Austria (b. and d. Wiener Neustadt, 1424).
 Rudolph of Austria (b. and d. Wiener Neustadt, 1424).

Ancestry

Footnotes

|-

|-

1390s births
1429 deaths
Nobility from Warsaw
15th-century Polish nobility
15th-century Polish women
15th-century Austrian women
15th-century Austrian people
Piast dynasty
15th-century House of Habsburg
German duchesses
Austrian royal consorts
Polish people of Lithuanian descent
Polish people of Russian descent
Polish people of German descent
Medieval nobility of the Holy Roman Empire